Eduardo Prieto Souza (6 February 1882 – 13 March 1963) was a Mexican fencer. He competed in the individual and team épée events at the 1932 Summer Olympics.

References

External links
 

1882 births
1963 deaths
Sportspeople from Zacatecas
People from Zacatecas City
Mexican male épée fencers
Olympic fencers of Mexico
Fencers at the 1932 Summer Olympics
20th-century Mexican people